Leoh Dodo Digbeu (born 25 June 1990) is an Ivorian footballer who plays as a forward.

References

External links

1990 births
Living people
Ivorian footballers
Association football forwards
CS Minaur Baia Mare (football) players
CFR Cluj players
FC UTA Arad players
CS Național Sebiș players
CS Concordia Chiajna players
Africa Sports d'Abidjan players
Liga I players
Liga II players
Ivorian expatriate footballers
Expatriate footballers in Romania
Ivorian expatriate sportspeople in Romania
People from Adzopé